Carpentaria is a coastal locality in the Shire of Carpentaria, Queensland, Australia.

Geography 
The locality is on the southern coast of the Gulf of Carpentaria. It is part of the Gulf Country. The Burketown Normanton Road passes through the locality from the south-east (Normanton) to the south-west (Stokes).

History 
The name derives from the Gulf of Carpentaria, a name used on Dutch charts since 1700.

Education 
There are no schools in Carpentaria. The nearest schools are in Normanton (P-10) and Burketown (P-6).

References

External links

Shire of Carpentaria
Coastline of Queensland
Localities in Queensland